William Rich may refer to:

 Sir William Rich, 2nd Baronet, (c. 1654–1711), MP
 Sir William Rich, 4th Baronet (c. 1702–1762), see Rich baronets
 William Rich (botanist), American botanist and explorer

See also
 William the Rich (disambiguation)